Soil Resources Development Institute (SRDI) is a government organization under the Ministry of Agriculture working as a statutory organization that carries out research on soil and surveys on soil quality to improve agriculture in Bangladesh and is located in Dhaka, Bangladesh.

History
It started out as the East Pakistan branch of Directorate of the Soil Survey Project of Pakistan. In 1982 it was updated and the Soil Resources Development Institute was established.

References

Research institutes in Bangladesh
Government agencies of Bangladesh
1982 establishments in Bangladesh
Soil and crop science organizations
Agriculture research institutes in Bangladesh